Jorge Gustavo Roverano Soto (born July 22, 1967 in Montevideo, Uruguay) is a Uruguayan-Peruvian footballer who played for clubs of Uruguay, Chile, Peru and Colombia.

Teams
  Cerro 1984-1991
  Deportes Concepción 1992
  Cerro 1993
  Bella Vista 1994
  Unión Magdalena 1995
  Central Español 1996
  Deportivo Pesquero 1997-1998
  Alianza Atlético 1999-2000
  Alianza Lima 2001-2003
  Sporting Cristal 2004
  Universidad San Martín de Porres 2005
  José Gálvez FBC 2006
  Total Clean 2007
  Deportivo Garcilaso 2008
  Club Sport Cartaginés 2018

References
 

1967 births
Living people
Uruguayan footballers
Uruguayan expatriate footballers
Peruvian footballers
Peruvian expatriate footballers
C.A. Cerro players
Deportes Concepción (Chile) footballers
C.A. Bella Vista players
Unión Magdalena footballers
Central Español players
Deportivo Pesquero footballers
Alianza Atlético footballers
Club Alianza Lima footballers
Sporting Cristal footballers
Club Deportivo Universidad de San Martín de Porres players
José Gálvez FBC footballers
Total Chalaco footballers
Real Garcilaso footballers
Uruguayan Primera División players
Categoría Primera A players
Peruvian Primera División players
Expatriate footballers in Chile
Expatriate footballers in Peru
Expatriate footballers in Uruguay
Expatriate footballers in Colombia
Uruguayan expatriate sportspeople in Chile
Uruguayan expatriate sportspeople in Peru
Uruguayan expatriate sportspeople in Colombia
Peruvian expatriate sportspeople in Chile
Peruvian expatriate sportspeople in Uruguay
Peruvian expatriate sportspeople in Colombia
Association football goalkeepers
Uruguayan football managers
Uruguayan expatriate football managers
Peruvian football managers
Peruvian expatriate football managers
Alianza Atlético managers